Bryan Jafet Ruiz González (born 18 August 1985) is a Costa Rican former professional footballer. A left-footed attacking midfielder, he also played as a second striker.

Ruiz is the only Central American footballer to have played in the UEFA Champions League, the UEFA Europa League, and the CONMEBOL Copa Libertadores.

Club career

Alajuelense
Ruiz began his professional career at 18, making his debut for Liga Deportiva Alajuelense on 30 November 2003 against Municipal Pérez Zeledón, in Costa Rica's top division. He formed a trio with 2 strikers, Rolando Fonseca and Froylán Ledezma, where he built a reputation as a goalscorer and a play maker.

Ruiz scored his first goal on 23 December 2003 against Ramonense, netting twice against Fernando Patterson. In Alajuelense, he was nicknamed La Comadreja (The Weasel), for his facial profile. He was on the team when it won regional titles such as the UNCAF Cup and the CONCACAF Champions' Cup.

Gent
In the summer of 2006, Ruiz was signed by Gent in a four-year deal along with Randall Azofeifa from Deportivo Saprissa and Roy Myrie from Liga Deportiva Alajuelense. He scored his first hat-trick playing on 8 December 2007 against Lokeren. In that season in the Belgian League, he was the captain and top scorer for the team.

Twente

On 15 July 2009, the Dutch club FC Twente announced that they had signed Ruiz for a fee of around €5 million, and agreed to receive a percentage of a subsequent transfer. He signed a four-year deal with the Eredivisie side.

Ruiz made his debut for the new club by scoring the second goal of the match, with an assist from another newcomer, Miroslav Stoch, in an away defeat of Sparta Rotterdam. His goal against NAC Breda on 12 December 2009 marked the tenth consecutive match in which he had scored. On 27 March 2010, Ruiz made one of the quickest hat-tricks ever against Sparta, with goals in the 46th, 49th and 50th minutes.

On 2 May 2010, FC Twente were crowned champions of Eredivisie for the first time in their history, with a 2–0 win at NAC Breda; Ruiz scored the first goal of the match during the 23rd minute of play. He finished the season as top scorer for Twente with 24 goals in Eredivisie play.

In August 2011, Ruiz was being watched by scouts from Arsenal and Tottenham Hotspur; however, on 18 August 2011 Ruiz claimed that Fulham was in talks with him. He stated to a local source "Fulham is a serious option for me. "That is also a Premier League side and it is a fantastic league. "Fulham already contacted my agent. If Fulham does become serious, we will definitely talk."

Fulham

On 31 August 2011, the last day of the Premier League summer transfer window, Fulham announced signing Ruiz for an undisclosed fee. His début was on Sunday, 11 September 2011 at home to Blackburn Rovers and he scored his first goal for Fulham in a 3–1 home defeat against Everton on 23 October 2011.

In the fixture against Bolton at the Reebok Stadium on 7 April 2012, Ruiz broke a bone in his foot, leading to a stretcher taking him off and him needing an operation, which sidelined him for 10 weeks.

On 18 August 2012, Ruiz started Fulham's first Premier League game of the season, a 5–0 win against Norwich and assisted Mladen Petrić in scoring his second goal in his debut match. He finished the 2012–13 season making 31 first-team appearances and scoring five goals.

PSV Eindhoven (loan)
Ruiz joined Eredivisie club PSV Eindhoven on 15 January 2014, on loan until the end of the season.

He made his debut on 19 January 2014 in a 1–0 loss to Ajax and scored his first goal for the club on 14 February with a 63rd-minute winner against Heracles Almelo.

Sporting CP
On 7 July 2015, Ruiz joined Sporting CP on a three-year contract. He made his debut for the club in the 2015 Supertaça match against Lisbon rivals S.L. Benfica, which Sporting won 1–0.

On 1 October 2015, Ruiz scored his first goal for Sporting against Beşiktaş in the group stage of the UEFA Europa League. His first goal in the Primeira Liga came in a 3–0 Lisbon derby defeat of Benfica at the Estádio da Luz on 25 October. In another derby, on 5 March 2016, he missed an open goal, and Benfica won the match 1–0 at Estádio José Alvalade, knocking out Sporting to second place in the league.

Santos
On 11 July 2018, free agent Ruiz signed a two-and-a-half-year contract with Santos FC. He made his debut for the club on 8 August, replacing Diego Pituca at half-time in a 1–1 away draw against Ceará.

After only 12 league matches during his first season, Ruiz failed to appear a single minute during his second, under Jorge Sampaoli. On 13 July 2020, after again failing to play under Jesualdo Ferreira, he terminated his contract with the club after alleging "wage breaches and moral damage".

Return to Alajuelense
On 23 July 2020, Ruiz announced his return to Alajuelense. In December 2022, he officially retired from the professional game, and marked the occasion by participating in a friendly between Alajuelense and his former club Twente.

International career
Ruiz made his debut for Costa Rica against China on 19 June 2005.

He has represented the Ticos at the 2005, 2011 and 2015 CONCACAF Gold Cups, captaining the team at the latter tournament. His first international goal came against Honduras in the 2005 tournament.

Ruiz scored six times during the 2010 FIFA World Cup qualification campaign, as Costa Rica was knocked out by Uruguay in the intercontinental play-off. In the 2014 qualifiers, he scored three goals to lead the team to the tournament finals in Brazil.

In June 2014, Ruiz was named in Costa Rica's squad for the 2014 FIFA World Cup. In the team's opening match, he captained Los Ticos to a 3–1 defeat of Uruguay in Fortaleza. On 20 June, Ruiz scored the only goal as Costa Rica upset four-time champion Italy 1–0 to qualify for the round of 16, where he again scored his team's goal as they drew 1–1 with Greece. Ruiz later successfully converted his kick as Costa Rica prevailed 5–3 in the penalty shootout. At the quarter-final stage, Ruiz was one of two Costa Ricans to have their kicks saved by Tim Krul in a 4–3 penalty shootout loss to the Netherlands.

In May 2018, he was named in Costa Rica's 23-man squad for the 2018 FIFA World Cup in Russia. In the last group-stage match against Switzerland, he scored a last-minute equalizing goal from a penalty spot in 2–2 draw; however, the goal was credited as an own goal by Swiss goalkeeper Yann Sommer.

In November 2022, Ruiz was named to the 26-man squad for the 2022 FIFA World Cup, his final tournament for Costa Rica as he retired after the tournament.

Career statistics

Club

International

Scores and results list Costa Rica's goal tally first, score column indicates score after each Ruiz goal.

Honours
Alajuelense
CONCACAF Champions' Cup: 2004
Copa Interclubes UNCAF: 2005
Primera División: Apertura 2005, Clausura 2006, Apertura 2020
CONCACAF League: 2020

Twente
Eredivisie: 2009–10
KNVB Cup: 2010–11
Johan Cruyff Shield: 2010, 2011

Sporting CP
Taça da Liga: 2017–18
Supertaça Cândido de Oliveira: 2015

Costa Rica
Copa Centroamericana: 2014

Individual
CONCACAF Men's Player of the Year: 2016
CONCACAF Goal of the Year: 2014
CONCACAF Best XI: 2015, 2016, 2017
Jean-Claude Bouvy Trophy: 2008, 2009
Player of the season at FC Twente: 2010
BBC Goal of the Month: October 2011
IFFHS CONCACAF team of the decade 2011–2020
IFFHS CONCACAF Men's Team of All Time: 2021

Personal life
Ruiz has two brothers; one of them, Yendrick, is also a football player. Both Bryan and Yendrick were teammates in Alajuelense for a period of two weeks before Bryan signed for Gent. It was not until 14 August 2013, when both played together for the first time, in a friendly that Costa Rica played against Dominican Republic.

Ruiz worked as a columnist for Costa Rican sports newspaper Al Día from 2011 until the journal's ceasing in 2014.

See also
 List of men's footballers with 100 or more international caps

References

External links

Bryan Ruiz at Voetbal International 

1985 births
Living people
Footballers from San José, Costa Rica
Association football forwards
Costa Rican footballers
Costa Rica international footballers
K.A.A. Gent players
FC Twente players
Fulham F.C. players
PSV Eindhoven players
Sporting CP footballers
Santos FC players
Liga FPD players
Belgian Pro League players
Eredivisie players
Premier League players
English Football League players
Primeira Liga players
Campeonato Brasileiro Série A players
Costa Rican expatriate footballers
Expatriate footballers in Belgium
Expatriate footballers in the Netherlands
Expatriate footballers in England
Expatriate footballers in Portugal
Expatriate footballers in Brazil
Costa Rican expatriate sportspeople in Belgium
Costa Rican expatriate sportspeople in the Netherlands
Costa Rican expatriate sportspeople in England
Costa Rican expatriate sportspeople in Portugal
Costa Rican expatriate sportspeople in Brazil
Copa Centroamericana-winning players
FIFA Century Club
2005 CONCACAF Gold Cup players
2011 CONCACAF Gold Cup players
2014 FIFA World Cup players
2014 Copa Centroamericana players
2015 CONCACAF Gold Cup players
Copa América Centenario players
2017 CONCACAF Gold Cup players
2018 FIFA World Cup players
2019 CONCACAF Gold Cup players
2021 CONCACAF Gold Cup players
2022 FIFA World Cup players
L.D. Alajuelense footballers